Group 4 of the 2017 UEFA European Under-21 Championship qualifying competition consisted of six teams: Portugal, Israel, Greece, Hungary, Albania, and Liechtenstein. The composition of the nine groups in the qualifying group stage was decided by the draw held on 5 February 2015.

The group was played in home-and-away round-robin format. The group winners qualified directly for the final tournament, while the runners-up advanced to the play-offs if they were one of the four best runners-up among all nine groups (not counting results against the sixth-placed team).

Standings

Matches
Times are CEST (UTC+2) for dates between 29 March and 24 October 2015 and between 27 March and 29 October 2016, for other dates times are CET (UTC+1).

Goalscorers
5 goals

 Nikolaos Ioannidis
 Dániel Prosser
 Omri Altman

4 goals

 Liridon Latifi
 Shoval Gozlan
 Gonçalo Paciência
 André Silva

3 goals

 Rey Manaj
 Bence Mervó
 Michael Ohana
 Bruno Fernandes
 Gonçalo Guedes
 Ricardo Horta

2 goals

 Charalampos Mavrias
 Dor Hugi
 João Carvalho
 Gelson Martins
 Rúben Neves
 Daniel Podence
 Rúben Semedo

1 goal

 Endri Çekiçi
 Qazim Laçi
 Herdi Prenga
 Milot Rashica
 Charis Charisis
 Anastasios Donis
 Taxiarchis Fountas
 Efthimis Koulouris
 Kosmas Tsilianidis
 Nikos Vergos
 Norbert Balogh
 Zsombor Berecz
 Barnabás Bese
 Dávid Forgács
 Dániel Gera
 Zsolt Kalmár
 László Kleinheisler
 Dávid Márkvárt
 Dominik Nagy
 Roland Sallai
 Eyad Abu Abaid
 Moti Barshazki
 Oren Biton
 Dean David
 Gadi Kinda
 Dor Peretz
 Eliel Peretz
 Dennis Salanović
 Bruma
 João Cancelo
 Tobias Figueiredo
 Diogo Jota
 Rony Lopes
 Carlos Mané
 Rúben Vezo

1 own goal

 Yanik Frick (against Hungary)

References

External links
Standings and fixtures at UEFA.com

Group 4